The SABCA S.40 was a military trainer aircraft built in Belgium in 1939.

Design and development
The S.40 was a graceful, low-wing cantilever monoplane of conventional design with fixed, tailwheel undercarriage. The pilot and instructor sat in tandem cockpits, enclosed by sliding canopies.  A single engine driving a two-blade propeller was mounted in the nose. The main undercarriage units were fully independent, mounted under the wings, and enclosed in spats.  A small number were built for the Belgian military before the German invasion in 1940.

Specifications

Notes

References

 
 

1930s Belgian military trainer aircraft
SABCA aircraft
Low-wing aircraft
Single-engined tractor aircraft
Aircraft first flown in 1939